Catch-1782 is a Big Finish Productions audio drama based on the long-running British science fiction television series Doctor Who.

Plot
The Sixth Doctor and Mel attend the centenary celebrations for the National Foundation for Scientific Research. Looking into her family history and thanks to a temporal accident, Mel discovers that finding out the answers to a mystery within it may entail becoming part of history itself.

Cast
The Doctor — Colin Baker
Mel — Bonnie Langford
John Hallam — Derek Benfield
Henry Hallam — Keith Drinkel
Mrs McGregor — Jillie Meers
Dr Wallace — Michael Chance
Professor David Munro — Ian Fairbairn
Rachel — Rhiannon Meades

External links
Big Finish Productions – Catch-1782

2005 audio plays
Sixth Doctor audio plays
Fiction set in 1782